This article lists the characters from the Welsh children's television series Fireman Sam.

Pontypandy Fire Service

Fireman Sam

Fireman Samuel "Sam" Jones is the title character of the series. He is a senior firefighter for the Pontypandy Fire Service. He is a competent and brave firefighter, who helps keep the people of Pontypandy safe. He considers his job to be 'the best job in the world' and often helps out in emergencies even on his days off. However, he does have an inventive streak which sometimes gets him in trouble when one of his inventions goes haywire: since the sixth series, he has stopped inventing, though he can be creative from time to time, such as fashioning a barbecue out of an oil drum in the episode Sausages vs. Shrimps. He has been a mascot for British fire services used to promote fire safety to children. In the original series, he lives alone in Pontypandy and his niece and nephew Sarah and James. He mostly drives the fire engine Jupiter, which can hold himself, Elvis, and Station officer Steele (and Penny, sometimes). Has been based on the Bedford TK, later 6x4, then added the front end of a Volvo FL6 or MAN fire engine. In addition, he has a quad bike called Mercury, as it can be used in situations where other larger vehicles wouldn't be able to reach quickly.

Elvis Cridlington
Firefighter Elvis Cridlington is a firefighter in Pontypandy and the station mess manager. He is sort of Sam's sidekick and learns skills from Sam. As the fire station's cook, he enjoys cooking and playing guitar.

Station Officer Steele
Station Officer (Fire Captain in the US dub of the CGI series) Basil Steele (Norris Steele in the CGI series) is the officer in charge of Pontypandy Fire Station. He has a rail fire engine called Bessie and a mobile command unit.

Penny Morris
Firefighter Penny Morris is a firefighter in Pontypandy who was the only female firefighter (firewoman) from 1990 to 2015. Originally from Newtown, Penny moved to Pontypandy in Series 3. She is a trained lifeguard and certified scuba diver. She has a rescue tender called Venus, as currently based on a greatly modified Mini Cooper, and formerly a Range Rover Carmichael Commando.

Ellie Phillips
Firefighter Ellie Phillips is a firefighter in Pontypandy. Like Penny, she is a keen athlete and will stop at nothing to accomplish a task

Arnold McKinley
Firefighter Arnold McKinley is a firefighter in Pontypandy. He is an expert in technology and is often found in the office working on the computer.

Chief Fire Officer Boyce
Chief Fire Officer Boyce is the chief fire officer of the Pontypandy Fire Service from Newtown.

Pontypandy Police Force

PC. Malcom Williams
Police Constable Malcom Williams is a Police Officer in Pontypandy. He transferred from The Big City hoping for some peace and quiet, but not all as it seems.

Sgt. Rose Ravani
Sergeant Rose Ravani is the Senior Officer for Pontypandy Police Station, and puts all of her confidence in PC Malcom to keep Pontypandy the safe and happy place it always has been.

Adults

Trevor Evans
Trevor Evans is the bus driver of Pontypandy. He drives a 1985 Ford Transit Dormobile and is also an auxiliary firefighter in the original series.

Dilys Price
Dilys Price is the shopkeeper of the local store. She is a single mother to a son, Norman. Her original appearance was similar to that of Coronation Street character Hilda Ogden. She has her own car introduced in Alien Alert.

Bella Lasagne
Bella Lasagne is an original character from the series. She is an Italian citizen living in Wales and runs Bella's Café, a pizzeria in Pontypandy. She lives opposite the Price Family and has a pet cat named Rosa. She appeared from Series 1 to 5. She was absent from the sixth to ninth series but returned in Series 10. She has an Italian accent.

Mike Flood
Mike Flood is the handyman of the Flood family. He has a green van used for carrying tools for repair work.

Helen Flood
Helen Flood is the nurse of the Flood family. She has her own ambulance car and an ambulance van for the Mountain Rescue service.

Tom Thomas
Tom Thomas hails from Australia until he owns his Mountain Rescue Center. Has two helicopters called Wallaby 1 and Wallaby 2 and a yellow Jeep.

Ben Hooper
Ben Hooper is the coastguard in Pontypandy. He has driven a fireboat called Titan and a jet ski called Juno.

Joe Sparkes 
Joe Sparkes is the town's mechanic. His daughter is named Hannah and his wife is named Lizzie.

Lizzie Sparkes 
Lizzie Sparkes is the town's veterinary surgeon. She is also a member of the town's Volunteer Rescue Squad. Her husband is Joe and her daughter is Hannah.

Children

Norman Price

Norman Stanley Price is the son of shopkeeper Dilys Price. He is a mischievous redhead turned scapegoat who loves playing practical jokes and skateboarding. From Series 6, Norman became more troublesome. He has shown interest in becoming a firefighter himself one day, but he also has said he was going to be a shepherd when he grows up as stated in the episode Sheepdog Trials. He has also shown to be interested in science, as seen in the episode Chemistry Set. He is based on Dennis the Menace from The Beano.

Sarah and James
Sarah and James Jones are twin siblings. Sarah is the older twin and James is the younger twin. They are the niece and nephew of Sam, the son and daughter of Charlie and Bronwyn Jones, and the grandson and granddaughter of Gareth Griffiths. In the first five series, the two of them respected each other very much and were very well-behaved, but as of the sixth series, they have a sibling rivalry with each other and are not as well-behaved as they used to be. Originally, Sarah and James were very similar to each other, but later series developed them to have their own personalities. Sarah developed into being very outgoing, way tougher and braver than James and being a bit of a tomboy. While James developed into being sensitive and cautious, as he is often scared of many things and lacks confidence. Both Sarah and James have also changed appearance throughout the original series, the fifth series and the CGI series, mostly with the clothing. The two are always portrayed with short blonde hair.

Mandy Flood
Mandy Flood is an individual daughter living with Helen and Mike Flood.

Derek Abney Price
Derek Abney Price is Norman's cousin.

Hannah Sparkes 
Hannah Sparkes is an 11-year-old girl in a wheelchair introduced in series 9. She is the daughter of Joe and Lizzie Sparkes.

Visitors

Buck Douglas
Buck Douglas is a television presenter and an "alien hunter". He was introduced as the main antagonist in Alien Alert.

Flex Dexter
Flex Dexter is an actor from Hollywood, as the main antagonist in Set For Action!.

References 

Fireman Sam
Fictional firefighters
Fictional Welsh people
Lists of British television series characters